Liaoning Chengda Company Limited is a state-owned conglomerate enterprise in Dalian, Liaoning, China. It is engaged in exports and imports, trading, chemical fertilizers, pharmaceuticals, property leasing, biological vaccine and warehousing.

It was established in 1993, starting as Liaoning Knitwear and Home-Textiles Import & Export Company. Its A shares were listed on the Shanghai Stock Exchange in 1996.

References

External links
Liaoning Chengda Company Limited

Conglomerate companies of China
Government-owned companies of China
Companies based in Dalian
Conglomerate companies established in 1993
1993 establishments in China
Companies listed on the Shanghai Stock Exchange